China's Defense White Paper is a document published by China mostly every two years that outlines its National Defense Strategy.

List

Notes

References

External links 
 White Papers. Ministry of National Defense. The People's Republic of China.

People's Liberation Army